Gold Trip (foaled 10 March 2017) is a Group 1 winning French-bred Thoroughbred racehorse that is most notable for winning the 2022 Melbourne Cup.

Background 
Gold Trip is out of the Aga Khan mare Sarvana, who was unplaced in one minor race.  Bred by Michael Monfort, he was sold as a yearling for €60,000 at the 2018 Arqana August Yearling Sale in Deauville, France.

Racing career
Originally trained in France by Fabrice Chappet, Gold Trip was beaten a head at his racing debut at Deauville on October 24, 2019.  His only win in France was in the Group II Prix Greffulhe in 2020.  He also ran 3rd in the Group I Grand Prix de Paris behind Mogul and 4th in the Prix de l'Arc de Triomphe behind Sottsass.
In 2021, Gold Trip placed in the Prix Ganay and the Grand Prix de Saint-Cloud before being sold to Australian Bloodstock syndicators to race in Australia for a reported purchase price of A$2.3 million.
In Australia, Gold Trip ran placings in the Naturalism Stakes and Caulfield Cup before winning the 2022 Melbourne Cup by a margin of 2 lengths at the odds of 20/1.

Pedigree

References 

Racehorses bred in France
Racehorses trained in Australia
Melbourne Cup winners
2017 racehorse births
Racehorses trained in France